The 346th Infantry Division was a division of the German Army during the Second World War.

It was formed on 21 September 1942 at Bad Hersfeld. The majority of its manpower transferred from formations serving in France on occupation duties. In November 1942, the division was sent to France as a static or garrison division, initially at St Malo but moved to Le Havre in the spring of 1944, where it became involved in the battles of the Normandy landings.

Formation

Commanders
Lieutenant General Erich Diestel, (1 October 1942 - 16 October 1944)
Major General Walter Steinmuller, (16 October 1944 - 1 February 1945)
Major General Gerhard Lindner, (1 February 1945 - 8 May 1945)
 
Units
857th Fortress Infantry Regiment (two battalions)
858th Fortress Infantry Regiment (three battalions)
346th Artillery Regiment (three battalions)
630th Ost Infantry Battalion
857th Ost Infantry Battalion

Notes

References

Infantry divisions of Germany during World War II